Eyak (Igya'aq in Alutiiq; ’Iiyaaq(daat) in Eyak) is an Alaska Native Village Statistic Area within the city of Cordova, Alaska in Valdez-Cordova Census Area, Alaska, United States. It was formerly a census-designated place (CDP) from 1980 to 1990, before being annexed to Cordova. As of 2010 the population was 128, down from 168 in 2000.

The community was named after the Eyak people.

Demographics

Eyak first appeared on the *1900 U.S. Census as an unincorporated village (*note may have appeared previously as Ighiak in 1890, requires more research). It next appeared on the 1920-1940 censuses and then not again until 1980 when it was made a census-designated place (CDP). After 1990 it was annexed into the city of Cordova. However, it still holds the distinction of being an Alaskan Native Village Statistical Area (ANVSA) within Cordova in the 2000 and 2010 U.S. Censuses.

Notes

References
 Alaska Division of Community Advocacy
 Department of Environmental and Natural Resources

Cordova, Alaska
Unincorporated communities in Alaska
Unincorporated communities in Chugach Census Area, Alaska
Unincorporated communities in Unorganized Borough, Alaska